NGC 329 is a spiral galaxy in the constellation Cetus. It was discovered on September 27, 1864 by Albert Marth. It was described by Dreyer as "faint, extended."

References

External links
 

0329
18640927
Cetus (constellation)
Spiral galaxies
Discoveries by Albert Marth
003467